Eva-Dina Delgado is a Democratic member of the Illinois House of Representatives for the 3rd district. The 3rd district, located in the Chicago area, includes parts of Elmwood Park, as well as all or parts of the Chicago neighborhoods of Austin, Belmont Cragin, Dunning, Hermosa, Logan Square, Montclare, and Portage Park.

Delgado was appointed to the seat after the resignation of former Illinois state representative Luis Arroyo. Arroyo resigned as the result of an indictment of federal program bribery. Her appointment came under contentious fire from then-Illinois House Speaker Michael Madigan after proxy votes from former representative Arroyo were used to select Delgado as his replacement.

As of July 2, 2022, Representative Delgado is a member of the following committees:

 Appropriations - Public Safety Committee (HAPP)
 Consumer Protection Committee (HCON)
 Elementary & Secondary Education: Administration, Licensing & Charter Schools Committee
 Financial Protection Subcommittee (HCON-FINA)
 Natural Gas Subcommittee (HPUB-NGAS)
 Public Utilities Committee (HPUB)
 Transportation: Vehicles & Safety Committee (HVES)

Electoral history

References

External links
Representative Eva Dina Delgado at the Illinois General Assembly

21st-century American politicians
Living people
Politicians from Chicago
Hispanic and Latino American state legislators in Illinois
Hispanic and Latino American women in politics
Women state legislators in Illinois
Democratic Party members of the Illinois House of Representatives
Year of birth missing (living people)
21st-century American women politicians